John Shiel (13 May 1917 – 30 November 2013) was an English professional footballer, who played for North Shields, Newcastle United and Huddersfield Town. He was born in Seahouses. At the time of his death in 2013, he was the oldest former Newcastle United player.

References

1917 births
2013 deaths
Association football midfielders
English Football League players
English footballers
Huddersfield Town A.F.C. players
Newcastle United F.C. players
North Shields F.C. players
Sportspeople from Northumberland